FC Laval (formerly CS Fabrose) is a Canadian semi-professional soccer club based in Laval, Quebec that plays in the Première Ligue de soccer du Québec. In 2021, CS Fabrose merged with youth clubs CS Chomedey and Delta Laval to form FC Laval.

History

CS Fabrose

The club was originally formed in 1971 following a merger of a few area clubs and adopted the name CS Fabrose, in 1974.

In 2018, the club joined the Première Ligue de soccer du Québec, a Division III league, fielding a team in the men's division. They played their first match on May 5 against CS Mont-Royal Outremont. They finished in seventh place out of eight teams in their inaugural season, but improved to 4th place in the 2019 season with Felipe Costa de Souza leading the league in goals scored with 13. However, despite only finishing fourth in the league, the club won the PLSQ League Cup, earning their first title, defeating CS Mont-Royal Outremont 2–0 in the final.

In 2019, they added a team in the women's division of the Première Ligue de soccer du Québec. While the 2020 season was initially interrupted due to the COVID-19 pandemic, the club was one of the teams that committed to fielding teams in both the male and female divisions for the shortened season, with the players agreeing to play without compensation. The women's team finished in second place after losing in the finals to AS Blainville in penalty kicks.

FC Laval
In 2021, CS Fabrose merged with youth clubs CS Chomedey and Delta Laval to form FC Laval (originally the name was set to be CS Laval-Ouest). The club completely overhauled their roster from the Fabrose side in 2020, with nearly a completely new roster, featuring many young players. In their first game as a new club, on July 4, 2021, they drew 2–2 against four-time defending champions AS Blainville. Ultimately they finished fourth in their maiden season as a new club.

In September 2021, they became the first club to partner and join CF Montréal's Scouting and Development Centre, where they will work in tandem on development of Laval's players.

In 2022, the club won the men's PLSQ, winning sixteen matches and losing only once in 22 matches, qualifying them to compete in the 2023 Canadian Championship.

Seasons

Men
as CS Fabrose

as FC Laval

Women
as CS Fabrose

as FC Laval

Notable former players
The following players have either played at the professional or international level, either before or after playing for the PLSQ team:

Honours
PLSQ Champions (1): 2022
Coupe PLSQ Winners (1): 2019

References

Soccer clubs in Quebec
Laval
Association football clubs established in 2021
2021 establishments in Quebec
Laval, Quebec